Novoorzhytske is an urban-type settlement in Lubny Raion of Poltava Oblast in Ukraine. It is located on the Viazivets, a tributary of the Sliporid in the drainage basin of the Dnieper. Novoorzhytske hosts the administration of Novoorzhytske settlement hromada, one of the hromadas of Ukraine. Population: 

Until 18 July 2020, Novoorzhytske belonged to Orzhytsia Raion. The raion was abolished in July 2020 as part of the administrative reform of Ukraine, which reduced the number of raions of Poltava Oblast to four. The area of Orzhytsia Raion was merged into Lubny Raion.

Economy

Transportation
There is some passenger traffic through the station.

The settlement has access to highway M03 connecting Kyiv and Kharkiv via Poltava.

References

Urban-type settlements in Lubny Raion